Baliadangi is an Upazila of Thakurgaon District in the Division of Rangpur, Bangladesh.

Geography
It has a total area of 284.12 km2.

Baliadangi upazila is bounded by Atwari Upazila in Panchagarh District on the north, Thakurgaon Sadar Upazila on the east, Ranisankail Upazila on the south and Goalpokhar I and Islampur CD blocks in Uttar Dinajpur district, West Bengal, India, on the west.

Demographics

According to the 2011 Bangladesh census, Baliadangi Upazila had 45,509 households and a population of 195,049, 7.9% of whom lived in urban areas. 11.2% of the population was under the age of 5. The literacy rate (age 7 and over) was 43.4%, compared to the national average of 51.8%.

Administration
Baliadangi, primarily formed as a Thana in 1806, was turned into an upazila on 2 July 1983.

The Upazila is divided into eight union parishads: Amjankhore, Bara Palashbari, Barabari, Bhanor, Charol, Dhantala, Duosuo, and Paria. The union parishads are subdivided into 78 mauzas and 78 villages.

College
Somiruddin Smrity College is a renowned College in Baliadangi.

See also
Upazilas of Bangladesh
Districts of Bangladesh
Divisions of Bangladesh

References

Upazilas of Thakurgaon District